Mary Gill may refer to:

 Mary Gabriel Gill (1837–1905), New Zealand Catholic prioress
 Mary Louise Gill, American professor of classics and philosophy
 Mary James Gill (born 1985), Pakistani politician
 Mary Wright Gill, scientific illustrator
 Mary Gill, wife of Eric Gill